The football tournament at the 2003 Southeast Asian Games was held from 30 November to 12 December in Hanoi, Ho Chi Minh City, Hai Phong and Nam Định of Vietnam. The men's tournament was played by U-23 (under 23 years old) national teams, while the women's tournament had no age limit.

Venues

Medal winners

Men's tournament

Participants 

 
 
 
 
 
 
 
 

All times are Indochina Time (UTC+7)

Group stage

Group A

Group B

Knockout stage

Semi-finals

Bronze medal match

Gold medal match

Winners

Goalscorers

9 goals:
 Sarayuth Chaikamdee
6 goals:
 Akmal Rizal Ahmad Rakhli
 Soe Myat Min
4 goals:
 Phạm Văn Quyến
3 goals:
 Indra Putra Mahayuddin
 K. Rajan
 Mohd Noh Alam Shah
2 goals:
 Juzaili Samion
 Kyaw Thu Ra
 Masrezwan Masturi
 Rungroj Sawangsri
 Datsakorn Thonglao
 Phan Thanh Bình

1 goal:
 Chea Virath
 Ung Kanyanith
 Bambang Pamungkas
 Mohd Syamsuri Mustafa
 Yosri Derma Raju
 Zainizam Marjan
 Aung Kyaw Moe
 Htay Aung
 Khin Maung Tun
 Tint Naing Tun Thein 
 Nattaporn Phanrit
 Pichitphong Choeichiu
 Piyawat Thongman 
 Teeratep Winothai
 Lê Công Vinh
 Lê Quốc Vượng

Final ranking

Women's tournament

Participants 

 
 
 
 
 
 
 

All times are Indochina Time (UTC+7)

Group stage

Group A

Group B

Knockout stage

Semi-finals

Bronze medal match

Gold medal match

Winner

Goalscorers

5 goals:
 Chownee Phanlet
 Lưu Ngọc Mai
4 goals:
 Aye Nandar Hlaing
3 goals:
 Norlelawati Ngah
 San San Kyu
 Zin Mar Wann
 Narumon Piamsin
 Văn Thị Thanh
2 goals:
 Jenny Merlin Yansip
 My Nilar Htwe
 Nhin Si Myint
 Chutima Takonrum
 Phùng Minh Nguyệt
 Nguyễn Thị Mai Lan

1 goals:
 Marion Pakage
 Laini Ahing
 Nwe Nwe Toe
 Hla Hla Than
 Supaphon Kaeobaen
 Đoàn Thị Kim Chi
 Đỗ Thị Phượng
 Nguyễn Thị Hà
 Phạm Quỳnh Anh
Own goal:
 Gusriwati (For Philippines)
 Pranee Saipin (For Vietnam)

Final ranking

External links 

Sou
Football at the Southeast Asian Games
2003
2003 Southeast Asian Games events
2003 in Vietnamese football